This is a list of public art in the London Borough of Croydon.

Coombe

Croydon

Croydon Airport

Old Coulsdon

Selhurst

Woodcote

References

External links
 

Croydon
Croydon
Tourist attractions in the London Borough of Croydon